The Sanremo Music Festival 1971 was the 21st annual Sanremo Music Festival, held at the Sanremo Casino in Sanremo, province of Imperia between 25 and 27 February 1971. The final night was broadcast by Rai 1, while the first two nights were broadcast live only by radio. The show was presented by actors Carlo Giuffrè and Elsa Martinelli.

According to the rules of this edition every song  was performed in a double performance by a couple of singers or groups.
The winners of the Festival were Nicola Di Bari and Nada with the song "Il cuore è uno zingaro".

Participants and results

References 

Sanremo Music Festival by year
1971 in Italian music
1971 in music
1971 music festivals